The 2007 Cup of Russia was the fifth event of six in the 2007–08 ISU Grand Prix of Figure Skating, a senior-level international invitational competition series. It was held at the Sports Palace Megasport in Moscow on November 22–25. Medals were awarded in the disciplines of men's singles, ladies' singles, pair skating, and ice dancing. Skaters earned points toward qualifying for the 2007–08 Grand Prix Final. The compulsory dance was the Yankee Polka.

Results

Men

Ladies
Kim Yuna set a world record for the free skating score for a lady under Code of Points (133.70).

Pairs

Ice dancing

External links

 Starting orders and results
  

Cup Of Russia, 2007
Cup of Russia
Rostelecom Cup